Lou! Journal infime is a 2014 French comedy film directed by Julien Neel, based on the first volume of his comic book series, Lou!. The screenplay was written by Julien Neel and Marc Syrigas. It stars Lola Lasseron, Ludivine Sagnier, Kyan Khojandi, and Nathalie Baye.

Lou! Journal infime premiered at the Festival du film francophone d'Angoulême on 24 August 2014, and was released in France on 8 October 2014.

Plot

Cast
 Lola Lasseron as Lou
 Ludivine Sagnier as Emma 
 Kyan Khojandi as Richard 
 Nathalie Baye as Lou's grandmother
 Joshua Mazé as Tristan  
 Eden Hoch as Mina 
 Lily Taïb as Marie-Emelie 
 Léa Nataf as Karine 
 Virgile Hurard as Jean-Jean 
 Téo Yacoub as Preston 
 Sacha Vassort as Manolo 
 Anne Agbadou-Masson as Jocelyne 
 Winston Ong as Gino 
 Julie Ferrier as Sophie
 François Rollin as Henry
 Pierre Rousselet as Robert

Production

Development
In September 2013, Variety reported that StudioCanal was set to co-produce, distribute, and sell the film.

Filming
Filming began on 28 October 2013 at the Bry-sur-Marne studio and in Paris, with additional scenes filmed at Lycee Jules Verne in Cergy. Filming ended on 17 January 2014.

Music
Julien Di Caro, the composer for the animated television series, returned to score the film.

Home media
Lou! Journal infime was released on DVD and Blu-ray on 10 February 2015.

Critical response
Film review aggregator Rotten Tomatoes reported a 17% approval rating, with an average rating of 4.4/10, based on 6 reviews.

References

External links

 

2014 films
French comedy films
2014 comedy films
Films about families
StudioCanal films
Films shot in Paris
Films based on French comics
Live-action films based on comics
2014 directorial debut films
2010s French-language films
2010s French films